Hankuk University of Foreign Studies Station is a station on Line 1 of the Gyeongwon Line.

The original name of this station was Hwigyeong Station (휘경역; 徽慶驛), although this station is located in Imun 1-dong. Because Hoegi Station (Preceding station) is located in Hwigyeong-dong, in 1996, the name of this station was changed to Hankuk University of Foreign Studies Station, after a nearby eponymous university. Originally the station was built on a 4-way crossroad layout. However in 2012, due to a series of accidents and safety concerns, a tunnel was built under the track for road traffic alongside an above ground pedestrian walkway. Despite this, the ground level crossing remains to this day.

Vicinity
Exit 1: Hankuk University of Foreign Studies
Exit 2: Igyeong Market

References 

Seoul Metropolitan Subway stations
Metro stations in Dongdaemun District
Railway stations opened in 1974
Hankuk University of Foreign Studies